Calvin C. Moore (born November 2, 1936 in New York City) is an American mathematician who works in the theory of operator algebras and topological groups.

Moore graduated from Harvard University with a bachelor's degree in 1958 and with a Ph.D. in 1960 under the supervision of George Mackey (Extensions and cohomology theory of locally compact groups). In 1961 he became assistant professor at the University of California, Berkeley and professor in 1966. From 1977 to 1980, he was director of the Center for Pure and Applied mathematics.

With Shiing-Shen Chern and Isadore Singer, he co-founded Mathematical Sciences Research Institute in 1982. From 1964 to 1965 he was at the Institute for Advanced Study in Princeton, New Jersey.

He is a fellow of the American Academy of Arts and Sciences. From 1965 to 1967 he was a Sloan Fellow. From 1971 to 1979 he was a member of the Board of Trustees of the American Mathematical Society, whose fellow he is. Since 1977, he is co-editor of the Pacific Journal of Mathematics. From 1978 to 1979 he was a Miller research professor at Berkeley.

He has written on a history of mathematics at Berkeley.

Writings 
 With Claude Schochet, Global Analysis on Foliated Spaces, MSRI Publications, Springer Verlag 1988, 2nd ed., Cambridge University Press 2006.

References

External links 
 Homepage

20th-century American mathematicians
21st-century American mathematicians
Fellows of the American Mathematical Society
1936 births
Living people
Harvard University alumni
American historians of mathematics
University of California, Berkeley faculty
Scientists from New York City
American founders
Mathematicians from New York (state)